The Battle of Columbus may refer to:

 The Battle of Columbus (1865), the last major land battle in the Eastern Theater of the American Civil War, April 16, 1865
 The Battle of Columbus (1916), a conflict between Pancho Villa and the U.S. Cavalry occurring in the Southwest U.S.